is a municipality in the Rhein-Neckar-Kreis (Baden-Württemberg), about 10 km south of Heidelberg. It is on a much traveled tourist route: Bergstraße ("Mountain Road") and Bertha Benz Memorial Route. The hamlet Maisbach also belongs to Nußloch.

History
Nußloch was first mentioned on December 31, 766 in a deed of gift to the Lorsch Abbey. A married couple of strong faith donated a vineyard to the monastery from their property in Nußloch. It has been under the control of the Palatinate at the latest since 1269. The hamlet Maisbach was annexed April 1, 1937. Literally translated, the German name Nußloch means "Nut Hole".

Government
Nußloch has a municipal council with 18 members according to the municipal code of Baden-Württemberg. The mayor also has a seat and a vote in the municipal council as a regular member.

Municipal Council

Sister cities
The community of Nußloch has sister city relationships to the following communities:
  Andernos-les-Bains in France since 1977
  Nagyatád in Hungary since 2000
  Segorbe in Spain since 2001

Economy

Due to Nußloch's exposed south-west location, wine-growing had a long tradition and has always been part of small-scale farming. In the 19th century there were extensive areas under cultivation on the western slopes of the Leopoldsberg, the Wilhelmsberg and the Neuen Berg. Today, the vineyards have almost disappeared from the landscape. Remnants can still be found in the Wilhelmsberg district bordering on Wiesloch. A winery from Leimen supports local ecological cultivation.

The clothing company Betty Barclay employs more than 500 people in Nußloch. The factory outlet is supposed to be expanded to include 8000 square meters of salesfloor.

In Nußloch there is a large limestone quarry of the well-known company HeidelbergCement. The quarrying of the limestone began in 1899. After crushing, the crushed shell limestone is transported from Nußloch to Leimen with the help of a material cable car, that is about five kilometers long. The meanwhile aging facility (built in 1918) has proven to be a very environmentally friendly means of transport. During the First World War, the plant only operated irregularly, so that the cable car had to be shut down again and again. It can therefore only be assumed, that the company was really profitable from the end of 1918.

References

External links
 Official Homepage of Nußloch
 Homepage of the Nußloch library
 Homepage of the Red Cross youth organization in Nußloch

Rhein-Neckar-Kreis
Baden